Kåre Lunden (8 April 1930 – 18 July 2013) was a Norwegian historian, and Professor Emeritus of History at the University of Oslo.

Lunden was born in Naustdal.  He originally studied agronomy at the Norwegian College of Agriculture, graduating in 1957. He then worked six years as a civil servant in the Norwegian Ministry of Church Affairs and Education, before taking up history studies. There he graduated as cand.philol. in 1965. He was appointed by the King-in-Council as Professor of History at the University of Oslo in 1976.

He is a member of the Norwegian Academy of Science and Letters.

He was an able javelin thrower while studying. He represented the sports team of the Norwegian College of Agriculture, NLHI, and threw 50.27 metres in 1954.

He was a brother of poet Eldrid Lunden.

Selected bibliography
Norge under Sverre-ætten, volume 3 of Cappelens Norgeshistorie, 1976 
Biletet av fortida: innhogg i historisk fagteori, 1991 
Norsk grålysing, 1992
Den vakre snikkarkona: frå Geoffrey Chaucers Canterbury-forteljingar og andre mellomaldervers (ed.), 1992
Nasjon eller union? Refleksjonar og røynsler, 1993 
Dialog med fortida. Historie om .., 1995 
Norges Landbrukshistorie, volume 2, 2002

References

List of publications in FRIDA

1930 births
2013 deaths
People from Naustdal
20th-century Norwegian historians
Historians of agriculture
Social historians
Norwegian College of Agriculture alumni
Academic staff of the University of Oslo
Members of the Norwegian Academy of Science and Letters
Norwegian male javelin throwers